This article details the Leeds Rhinos rugby league football club's 2011 season. This is the sixteenth season of the Super League era.

Key Dates

February
 13 February
Leeds beat local rivals Bradford Bulls 32–28 at Millennium Stadium with 4 tries in the last 18 minutes. Including a hat trick from Ben Jones Bishop with the hat trick coming from a penalty try in the 78th Minute.

 16 February
Leeds "Fantastic Four" Kallum Watkins, Ben Jones Bishop, Ryan Hall and Chris Clarkson all sign 4 Year Contracts with the club.

 18 February
Leeds Rhinos beat Hull F.C. 32–18 at the KC Stadium, with a 70-yard finish from Ben Jones Bishop potentially an early contender for try of the season.

 24 February
Kevin Sinfield became a Rhino For Life, signing a 4 Year contract. Keeping the Leeds Rhinos captain at the club until the end of 2014.

 25 February
Leeds Rhinos lost their first game of the season to high flying Harlequins RL, 2 tries from Quins hooker Andy Ellis won them the game, despite a strong start by Leeds Rhinos.

March
 5 March
Warrington Wolves overpowered a Leeds Rhinos team with only 2 first choice props available. Despite a strong start taking an 8-point lead the Wolves scored 28 points on the bounce, despite 3 late tries Leeds Rhinos lost 40–24.
 11 March
The Rhinos managed to outclass a Salford side that started strongly taking a 6–0 lead. Leeds rallied and thanks to 2 tires from Carl Ablett, and classy performances from the likes of Kallum Watkins, Brent Webb, Rob Burrow and Kevin Sinfield winning the game 46–12. The only downside losing rising star Ben Jones Bishop with a dislocated shoulder. Brad Singleton also became Leeds Rhinos 50th Academy graduate to play for the club.

League table

2011 results

Results

2011 squad

2011 Transfers In/Out

Gains

Losses

Player statistics
Source:

References

External links
Leeds Rhinos Website
BBC Sport-Rugby League

Leeds Rhinos seasons
Leeds Rhinos
Rugby